The 2020 NC State Wolfpack football team represented North Carolina State University during the 2020 NCAA Division I FBS football season. The Wolfpack played their home games at Carter–Finley Stadium in Raleigh, North Carolina, and competed in the Atlantic Coast Conference (ACC). They were led by eighth-year head coach Dave Doeren. The Wolfpack finished the regular season 8–3, 7–3 in ACC play to finish in a tie for fourth place in the conference. They received an invite to the 2021 Gator Bowl where they lost to SEC foe Kentucky.

Previous season
The Wolfpack finished the 2019 season 4–8, 1–7 in ACC play to finish in seventh place in the Atlantic Division.

Schedule
NC State had games scheduled against Delaware, Mississippi State, and Troy, which were  canceled due to the COVID-19 pandemic.

Schedule Source:

The ACC released their schedule on July 29, with specific dates announced on August 6.

Rankings

Coaching staff

Game summaries

Wake Forest

at Virginia Tech

at Pittsburgh

at Virginia

Duke

at North Carolina

Miami

Florida State

Liberty

at Syracuse

Georgia Tech

vs. Kentucky–Gator Bowl

Players drafted into the NFL

References

NC State
NC State Wolfpack football seasons
NC State Wolfpack football